Jonathan Saharawi Barragán González (born October 20, 1991), known under the ring name Arez (often stylized as Arez), is a Mexican luchador, or professional wrestler. Since 2018, Arez has wrestled in Lucha Libre AAA Worldwide, where he is the current and inaugural La Leyenda Azul Blue Demon Champion and a former AAA World Mixed Tag Team Champion along with Chik Tormenta, as well as Major League Wrestling and on the independent circuit.

Arez has also wrestled in the United States in MLW and Impact Wrestling through their partnership with AAA. He was also part of the stable Los Indystrongtibles along with Belial and Impulso who were very well known and successful on the Mexican independent circuit between 2013 and 2018. The group has not been formally dissolved, but the three have rarely wrestled together since 2018, when Arez has become an increasingly big name in his own right. Arez has since developed a rivalry with Aramís, and they have fought several matches against each other.

Instead of wearing a mask, Arez wrestles in an advanced body and face painting inspired by the character Venom. Finn Bálor has in turn taken inspiration from Arez and sometimes uses a similar painting.

Professional wrestling career

Championships and accomplishments
Desert Pro Wrestling
LPF Championship (1 time, current)
Lucha Libre AAA Worldwide
AAA World Mixed Tag Team Championship (1 time) – with Chik Tormenta
La Leyenda Azul Blue Demon Championship (1 time, current) 
New Wrestling Generation
NWG Master Championship (1 time)
Perros del Mal
PDM Light Heavyweight Championship (1 time)
Pro Wrestling Illustrated
 Ranked No. 166 of the top 500 singles wrestlers in the PWI 500 in 2021
RIOT Wrestling Alliance
RIOT Championship (1 time)
Xplosion Nacional de Lucha Libre
XNL World Championship (1 time)

References

External links
 

1991 births
21st-century professional wrestlers
Living people
Mexican male professional wrestlers
Professional wrestlers from Mexico City
AAA World Mixed Tag Team Champions